Chubtarash Mahalleh (also Romanized as Chūbtarāsh Maḩalleh; also known as Chūbtāsh Maḩalleh) is a village in Rostamabad-e Shomali Rural District, in the Central District of Rudbar County, Gilan Province, Iran. At the 2006 census, its population was 79, in 18 families.

References 

Populated places in Rudbar County